Gabrielle R. Wolohojian is an American judge who serves as an associate justice of the Massachusetts Appeals Court.

Early life and career
The granddaughter of Armenian immigrants, Wolohojian graduated from Rutgers University in 1982, where she majored in English. She earned a doctorate in English language and literature from the University of Oxford in 1987. She graduated from Columbia Law School with a J.D. in 1989, where she served as an editor of the Columbia Law Review. After graduating from law school, she clerked for Rya Zobel, a judge of the U.S. District Court for the District of Massachusetts and Bailey Aldrich, a judge from Massachusetts who served on the U.S. Court of Appeals for the First Circuit. She then entered private practice, joining the firm that would become WilmerHale, where she was elected a partner. 

In 1994, Wolohojian left private practice for 16 months to serve as an Associate Independent Counsel on the investigation of Jim Guy Tucker, the former governor of Arkansas. She worked under Independent Counsel Robert B. Fiske.

Judicial career
On November 14, 2007, Massachusetts Governor Deval Patrick nominated Wolohojian to the appeals court to fill the seat left vacant by the retirement of Associate Justice Kenneth Laurence. After being confirmed by the Governor's Council, she took the oath of office on February 7, 2008.

Personal life
As of 2022, Wolohojian performs with the Boston Civic Symphony.

References

Living people
Rutgers University alumni
Alumni of Hertford College, Oxford
Columbia Law School alumni
American women judges
Wilmer Cutler Pickering Hale and Dorr partners
Judges of the Massachusetts Appeals Court
1960 births
21st-century American women